Parides lysander, the Lysander cattleheart, is a species of butterfly in the family Papilionidae. It is found in the Neotropical realm.

The larvae feed on Aristolochia species including A. huberiana, A. sprucei, A. littoralis, A. ruiziana, and A. leuconeura.

Subspecies
P. l. lysander Guianas
P. l. parsodes (Gray, [1853]) Brazil (Pará)
P. l. brissonius (Hübner, [1819]) Venezuela, Colombia, Ecuador, S.Peru, Brazil (Amazonas)
P. l. mattogrossensis (Talbot, 1928) Brazil (Mato Grosso)
P. l. antalcidas Tyler, Brown & Wilson, 1994 Brazil (Pará)
P. l. orinocoensis Constantino, Le Crom & Salazar, 2002 Colombia

Description from Seitz

P. lysander Cr. (= phrynichus Fldr.). Male with white scent-wool in the fold of the hindwing. Outer margin of the forewing in the female rounded; the last two red spots on the hindwing separated, standing obliquely one under the other; female-f. parsodes Gray (= sonoria Gray) has a large white area on the forewing, composed of several spots: in the female -f. arbates Stoll (= anaximenes Fldr.) the forewing has only one white spot; whilst in the female-f. brissonius Gray (5b) the forewing has no white spot at all. A male with yellow instead of red spots on the forewing has been described as ab. bari Oberth. — This species is known from the whole of the Amazon, East Peru and East Ecuador, as well as from the Guianas and Bogota; it has not hitherto been found in Bolivia nor in Brazil proper. It is a swamp species and flies heavily over the wettest places in the shade of the woods.

Description from Rothschild and Jordan (1906)

A full description is provided by Rothschild, W. and Jordan, K. (1906)

Taxonomy

Parides lysander is a member of the aeneas species group:

The members are
Parides aeneas 
Parides aglaope 
Parides burchellanus 
Parides echemon 
Parides eurimedes – mylotes cattleheart, Arcas cattleheart, pink-checked cattleheart, or true cattleheart 
Parides lysander 
Parides neophilus – spear-winged cattleheart
Parides orellana 
Parides panthonus – panthonus cattleheart 
Parides tros 
Parides zacynthus

References

Lewis, H. L., 1974 Butterflies of the World  Page 26, figure 14

Butterflies described in 1775
Parides
Papilionidae of South America
Taxa named by Pieter Cramer